The 2018 WNBA season was the 22nd season of the Women's National Basketball Association (WNBA). The Minnesota Lynx are the defending champions. The regular season began on May 18, with the Phoenix Mercury hosting the Dallas Wings. The season ended with the Seattle Storm defeating the Washington Mystics 3-0 in the WNBA Finals. This was the third championship for the Storm. Seattle's Breanna Stewart was named regular season and finals MVP.

2018 WNBA Draft 

The Las Vegas Aces selected A'ja Wilson first in the 2018 WNBA Draft. The draft was televised nationally on the ESPN networks (Round 1 on ESPN2, Rounds 2 and 3 on ESPNU).

Transactions

Retirement 
 On August 21, 2017, Plenette Pierson announced her retirement at the conclusion of the 2017 season. Pierson played 15 seasons and won three championships with the Detroit Shock and Minnesota Lynx.
 On February 3, 2018, Jia Perkins announced her retirement from the WNBA. Perkins played 14 seasons and won one championship with the Minnesota Lynx.

Free agency 
Free agency negotiations began on February 1.

Coaching changes

Arena changes 
In addition to the relocated Las Vegas Aces, two other teams announced permanent moves to new arenas for the 2018 season.
 The Chicago Sky moved from Allstate Arena in suburban Rosemont, Illinois to the newly opened Wintrust Arena at the McCormick Place exhibition center on Chicago's Near South Side. The move was initially announced by the Metropolitan Pier and Exposition Authority, owner and operator of McCormick Place, on July 25, 2017.  The Sky did not make their formal announcement until February 2, 2018.
 The New York Liberty announced on February 8, 2018 that they would move their primary home from Madison Square Garden, where they had played since the league's first season in 1997, to the Westchester County Center in suburban White Plains, New York. The team planned to play 15 of its 17 home games in White Plains, with the remaining two at the Garden.

Regular season

All-Star Game 

The 2018 WNBA All-Star Game was hosted by the Minnesota Lynx on July 28 at the Target Center. Coverage of the game began at 3:30pm. This is the first time the Lynx have hosted the annual event. This season a new selection format was used.  Fans, coaches, media and players would all vote for players to be selected to the All-Star Game. The top 22 players receiving votes based on this weighting will be selected to the All-Star Game. There was not a restriction on number of players from one conference. The top 2 vote getters were captains of the two All-Star teams and selected their teams from the pool of remaining 20 players. The 22 All-Stars were be revealed on July 17, 2018.  Rosters will be revealed on July 19, 2018.

Standings 
Source:

Statistic leaders 
The following shows the leaders for each statistic during the 2018 regular season.

Schedule 

|-
| rowspan=2|Thu April 12 || colspan=3| 2018 WNBA Draft: first round ||colspan=4| ESPN2 || New York City
|-
| colspan=3| 2018 WNBA Draft: later rounds ||colspan=4| ESPNU || New York City
|-
| rowspan=3|Sun May 6 || Washington Mystics || vs. || Minnesota Lynx || 85–90 MIN || Robinson (18) || Tied (6) || Wright (4) || Wells Fargo Arena4,203
|-
| Atlanta Dream || @ || Chicago Sky || 78–61 ATL || Hayes (16) || Parker (8) || Montgomery (7) || Wintrust Arena
|-
| China || @ || Las Vegas Aces || 63–98 LVA || Ting (22) || Tied (7) || Tied (5) || Mandalay Bay Events Center
|-
| rowspan=3|Mon May 7 || Chicago Sky || @ || Indiana Fever || 65–79 IND || Mavunga (18) || Tied (8) || Peterson (4) || Bankers Life Fieldhouse4,377
|-
| Dallas Wings || vs. || New York Liberty || 76–69 DAL || Stevens (19) || Stevens (10) || Zellous (4) || Mohegan Sun Arena
|-
| Los Angeles || @ || Connecticut Sun || 65–68 CON || Thomas (17) || Tied (8) || Pondexter (3) || Mohegan Sun Arena
|-
| rowspan=3|Tues May 8 || Phoenix Mercury || @ || Seattle Storm || 69–73 SEA || Loyd (15) || Tied (6) || Tied (3) || KeyArena3,502
|-
| Los Angeles || vs. || New York Liberty || 75–81 NYL || Nurse (19) || Gray (14) || Pondexter (5) || Mohegan Sun Arena1,106
|-
| Dallas Wings || @ || Connecticut Sun || 58–79 CON || Williams (18) || A. Thomas (12) || A. Thomas (5) || Mohegan Sun Arena3,695
|-
| Fri May 11 || Atlanta Dream || @ || Connecticut Sun || 58–74 CON || Tied (13) || Williams (6) || Tied (3) || Webster Bank Arena1,610
|-
| rowspan=4|Sat May 12 || China || @ || Los Angeles || 61–82 LAS || Gray (17) || Wang Jaiqui (8) || Gray (10) || Hutto-Patterson Gym1,650
|-
| Indiana Fever || @ || Washington Mystics || 56–91 WAS ||  Tied (15) || Hawkins (7) || Tied (3) || Acierno Arena (University of Delaware)3,323
|-
| Chicago Sky || @ || Minnesota Lynx || 58–87 MIN || Fowles (17) || Fowles (9) || Tied (5) || Target Center5,024
|-
| Seattle Storm || @ || Phoenix || 61–84 SEA || Canada (17) || Lyttle (11) || Bird (5) || Talking Stick Resort Arena4,535
|-
| Sun May 13 || Las Vegas Aces || @ || Dallas Wings || 55–68 DAL || Stevens (12) || Wilson (12) || Chong (4) || College Park Center
|-

|-
! style="background:#094480; color:white" | 2018 WNBA regular season
|-

|-
| Fri May 18 || Dallas Wings || @ || Phoenix Mercury || NBA TV, FSA+ || 78–86 PHO || Taurasi (26) || Bonner (12) || Diggins-Smith (9) || Talking Stick Resort Arena11,210
|-
| Sat May 19 || Chicago Sky || @ || Indiana Fever || NBA TV, WNDY || 82–64 CHI || Quigley (19) || Tied (8) || Tied (5) || Bankers Life Fieldhouse6,565
|-
| rowspan=6| Sun May 20 || Las Vegas Aces || @ || Connecticut Sun || Twitter || 65–101 CON || Young (23) || A. Thomas (17) || J. Thomas (6) || Mohegan Sun Arena6,637
|-
| Indiana Fever || @ || Washington Mystics || NBA TV, NBCSWA || 64–82 WAS || Achonwa (21) || Achonwa (12) || Delle Donne (7) || Capital One Arena7,400
|-
| Atlanta Dream || @ || Dallas Wings || Twitter, FFSW-DAL+ || 78–101 DAL || Diggins–Smith (25) || Christmas–Kelly (10) || Davis (5) || College Park Center5,907
|-
| Los Angeles Sparks || @ || Minnesota Lynx || ESPN2 || 77–76 LAS || Sims (21) || Fowles (12) || Whalen (9) || Target Center13,032
|-
| New York Liberty || @ || Chicago Sky || Twitter, The U Too, MSG+ || 76–80 CHI || Quigley (22) || Parker (8) || Hartley (6)  || Wintrust Arena7,922
|-
| Phoenix Mercury || @ || Seattle Storm || Twitter, KZJO-TV || 87–82 PHO || Griner (29) || Stewart (15) || Bonner (7) || KeyArena8,602
|-
| rowspan=2| Tues May 22 || Los Angeles Sparks || @ || Indiana Fever || Twitter || 87–70 LAS || Ogwumike (25) || Ogwumike (10) || Gray (8) || Bankers Life Fieldhouse4,742
|-
| Las Vegas Aces || @ || Washington Mystics || League Pass, Monumental || 70–75 WAS || Delle Donne (23) || Delle Donne (11) || Allen (6) || Capital One Arena4,509
|-
| rowspan=3| Wed May 23 || Atlanta Dream || @ || Chicago Sky || LeaguePass || 81–63 ATL || Hayes (22) || Breland (10) || Williams (6) || Wintrust Arena6,147
|-
| Dallas Wings || @ || Minnesota Lynx || League Pass, FSNTH || 68–76 MIN || Fowles (23) || Fowles (20) || Whalen (8) || Target Center7,834
|-
| Seattle Storm || @ || Phoenix Mercury || League Pass || 87–71 SEA || Loyd (29) || Stewart (11) || Tied (4) || Talking Stick Resort Arena8,068
|-
| rowspan=2| Thurs May 24 || Los Angeles Sparks || @ || Connecticut Sun || ESPN2 || 94–102 CON || Gray (21) || A. Thomas (9) || J. Thomas (8) || Mohegan Sun Arena5,571
|-
| Washington Mystics || @ || Indiana Fever || ESPN3, Monumental || 93–84 WAS || Delle Done (26) || Delle Done (10) || T. Mitchell (3) || Bankers Life Fieldhouse4,415
|-
| rowspan=2| Fri May 25 || Minnesota Lynx || @ || New York Liberty || LeaguePass, MSG+ || 78–72 MIN || Augustus (21) || Charles (12) || Robinson (5) || Westchester County Center2,315
|-
| Chicago Sky || @ || Seattle Storm || LeaguePass, KZJO-TV, The U Too || 91–95 (OT) SEA || Loyd (29) || Howard (10) || Tied (9) || KeyArena5,866
|-
| rowspan=2| Sat May 26 || Dallas Wings || @ || Atlanta Dream || LeaguePass, FSSE-ATL || 78–70 DAL || Diggins-Smith (24) || Cambage (14) || Tied (4) || McCamish Pavilion4,749
|-
| Indiana Fever || @ || Connecticut Sun || LeaguePass || 77–86 CON || A. Thomas (21) || McCall (9) || Wheeler (9) || Mohegan Sun Arena5,843
|-
| rowspan=3| Sun May 27 || Minnesota Lynx || @ || Washington Mystics || LeaguePass, NBCSWA || 78–90 WAS || Toliver (19) || Hines–Allen (13) || Cloud (8) || Capital One Arena5,723
|-
| Phoenix Mercury || @ || Los Angeles Sparks || LeaguePass, SpecSN || 72–80 LAS || Gray (23) || Ogwumike (8) || Gray (8) || Staples Center11,201
|-
| Seattle Storm || @ || Las Vegas Aces || NBA TV, KZJO-TV || 105–98 SEA || Wilson (27) || Stewart (9) || Loyd (9) || Mandalay Bay Events Center7,662
|-
| rowspan=3| Tues May 29 || Minnesota Lynx || @ || Atlanta Dream || Twitter || 74–76 ATL || Hayes (20) || Fowles (13) || Robinson (6) || McCamish Pavilion3,785
|-
| Dallas Wings || @ || New York Liberty || LeaguePass, MSG+ || 89–94 NYL || Charles (34) || Cambage (16) || Zellous (9) || Westchester County Center1,516
|-
| Washington Mystics || @ || Seattle Storm || Twitter, KZJO-TV || 77–81 SEA || Loyd (27) || Hines–Allen (11) || Bird (7) || KeyArena5,235
|-
| Wed May 30 || Washington Mystics || @ || Phoenix Mercury || LeaguePass, Monumental || 103–95 WAS || Toliver (30) || Hawkins (12) || Taurasi (7) || Talking Stick Resort Arena8,188
|-
| Thurs May 31 || Las Vegas Aces || @ || Seattle Storm || LeaguePass, KZJO-TV || 74–101 SEA || Tied (21) || Russell (8) || Bird (9) || KeyArena5,235
|-

|-

|-
| rowspan=3 | Fri June 1 || Phoenix Mercury || @ || Minnesota Lynx || ESPN2 || 95–85 PHO || Taurasi (29) || Griner (9) || Taurasi (6) || Target Center8,830
|-
| Connecticut Sun || @ || Chicago Sky || ESPN3, The U Too, NBCSB || 110–72 CON || Tied (20) || A. Thomas (13) || Vandersloot (7) || Wintrust Arena4,131
|-
| Washington Mystics || @ || Las Vegas Aces || LeaguePass, ATTSN-RM, Monumental || 73–85 LVA || Wilson (26) || Wilson (12) || Tied (4) || Mandalay Bay Events Center5,575
|-
| rowspan=2 | Sat June 2 || New York Liberty || @ || Indiana Fever || LeaguePass, FSIND, MSG+ || 87–81 NYL || Nurse (34) || Stokes (12) || Wheeler (7) || Bankers Life Fieldhouse5,575
|-
| Seattle Storm || @ || Dallas Wings || LeaguePass, FSSW-DAL+ || 90–94 DAL || Stewart (28) || Howard (9) || Canada (9) || College Park Center5,191
|-
| rowspan=4 | Sun June 3 || Phoenix Mercury || @ || Atlanta Dream || LeaguePass, FSSE-ATL || 78–71 PHO || McCoughtry (21) || McCoughtry (10) || Taurasi (8) || McCamish Pavilion3,796
|-
| Connecticut Sun || @ || Washington Mystics || LeaguePass, NBCSWA, NBCSB || 88–64 CON || J. Thomas (25) || Williams (10) || A. Thomas (4) || Capital One Arena5,176
|-
| Minnesota Lynx || @ || Los Angeles Sparks || LeaguePass, SpecSN || 69–77 LAS || Parker (19) || Parker (10) || Gray (6) || Staples Center13,500
|-
| Las Vegas Aces || @ || Chicago Sky || LeaguePass, The U Too || 90–94 CHI || De Shields (25) || Parker (13) || Vandersloot (9) || Wintrust Arena5,052
|-
| rowspan=2 | Tues June 5 || Phoenix Mercury || @ || New York Liberty || Twitter, MSG+ || 80–74 PHO || Griner (26) || Tied (8) || Taurasi (8) || Madison Square Garden7,215
|-
| Connecticut Sun || @ || Atlanta Dream || LeaguePass, FSSO, NBCSB || 77–82 ATL || Hayes (22) || A. Thomas (17) || A. Thomas (7) || McCamish Pavilion2,830
|-
| rowspan=3 | Thurs June 7 || Minnesota Lynx || @ || Washington Mystics || LeaguePass, NBCSWA || 88–80 WAS || Fowles (21) || Fowles (12) || Cloud (9) || Capital One Arena8,587
|-
| Connecticut Sun || @ || New York Liberty || LeaguePass, MSG+, NBCSB || 88–86 CON || Charles (24) || Tied (9) || J. Thomas (8) || Westchester County Center1,581
|-
| Seattle Storm || @ || Los Angeles Sparks || ESPN2 || 88–63 SEA || Ogwumike (19) || Howard (9) || Bird (8) || Staples Center9,204
|-
| rowspan=3 | Fri June 8 || Atlanta Dream || @ || Las Vegas Aces || LeaguePass, ATTSN-RM || 87–83 ATL || Hayes (24) || Tied (9) || Allen (7) || Mandalay Bay Events Center5,913
|-
| Dallas Wings || @ || Indiana Fever || LeaguePass || 89–83 DAL || Diggins-Smith (35) || Diggins-Smith (12) || Diggins-Smith (6) || Bankers Life Fieldhouse5,675
|-
| Chicago Sky || @ || Phoenix Mercury || LeaguePass, The U Too || 79–96 PHO || Williams (26) || Griner (8) || Taurasi (7) || Talking Stick Resort Arena8,834
|-
| Sat June 9 || Minnesota Lynx || @ || Connecticut Sun || NBA TV, NBCSB|| 75–89 CON || Williams (22) || Fowles (14) || Tied (4) || Mohegan Sun Arena6,771
|-
| rowspan=4| Sun June 10 || Indiana Fever || @ || New York Liberty || LeaguePass, MSG || 75–78 NYL || K. Mitchell (19) || Achonwa (10) || T. Mitchell (7) || Westchester County Center1,537
|-
| Chicago Sky || @ || Los Angeles Sparks || LeaguePass, SpecSN || 59–77 LAS || Can. Parker (24) || Che. Parker (12) || Faulkner (6) || Staples Center8,239
|-
| Las Vegas Aces || @ || Phoenix Mercury || LeaguePass, FSA+|| 66–72 PHO ||Taurasi (25) || Griner (15) || Plum (6) || Talking Stick Resort Arena8,471
|-
| Atlanta Dream || @ || Seattle Storm || LeaguePass, KZJO-TV || 67–64 ATL || Hayes (23) || Howard (15) || Tied (3) || Mohegan Sun Arena6,771
|-
| rowspan=4| Tues June 12 || Las Vegas Aces || @ || Indiana Fever || LeaguePass || 101–92 LVA || Wilson (35) || Achonwa (15) || Young (9) || Bankers Life Fieldhouse5,437
|-
| Phoenix Mercury || @ || Dallas Wings || Twitter, FSSW-DAL+ || 75–72 PHO || Taurasi (21) || Lyttle (10) || January (6) || College Park Center4,026
|-
| Chicago Sky || @ || Seattle Storm || LeaguePass, The U Too|| 85–96 SEA || Breanna Stewart (30) || Parker (10) || Tied (5) || KeyArena4,353
|-
| Atlanta Dream || @ || Los Angeles Sparks || NBA TV, SpecSN || 64–72 LAS || Parker (18) || Ogwumike (10) || Gray (7) || Staples Center9,215
|-
| rowspan=2| Wed Jun 13
| Washington Mystics
| @
| Connecticut Sun
| ESPN2
| 95–91 WAS
| Delle Donne (36)
| Ogwumike (13)
| J. Thomas (5)
| Mohegan Sun Arena
|-
| Las Vegas
| @
| New York Liberty
| ESPN3, MSG+
| 78–63 LVA
| Charles (19)
| Coleman (5)
| Allen (7)
| Westchester County Center1,419
|-
| Thur Jun 14
| Indiana Fever
| @
| Atlanta Dream
| NBA TV, FSSO
| 67–72 ATL
| Hayes (23)
| Breland (13)
| Wheeler (10)
| McCamish Pavilion6,561
|-
| rowspan=3| Fri June 15 || Los Angeles Sparks || @ || Washington Mystics || LeaguePass, NBCSWA, SpecSN || 97–86 LAS || Parker (23) || Sanders (11) || Parker (11) || Capital One Arena5,289
|-
| Las Vegas Aces
| @
| Dallas Wings
| NBA TV, FSSW-DAL+
| 67–77 DAL
| Cambage (28)
| Cambage (18)
| Diggins–Smith (6)
| College Park Center4,549
|-
| Connecticut Sun
| @
| Seattle Storm
| NBA TV, KZJO-TV, WCCT
| 92–103 SEA
| Ogwumike (30)
| Stewart (9)
| J. Thomas (6)
| KeyArena7,094
|-
| rowspan=3| Sat Jun 16
| Atlanta Dream
| @
| Indiana Fever
| LeaguePass, WNDY
| 64–96 IND
| Vivians (21)
| McCoughtry (8)
| K. Mitchell (5)
| Bankers Life Fieldhouse6,234
|-
| New York Liberty
| @
| Minnesota Lynx
| NBA TV, FSNTH, MSG+
| 71–85 MIN
| Fowles (25)
| Fowles (9)
| Robinson (8)
| Target Center9,114
|-
| Connecticut Sun
| @
| Phoenix Mercury
| LeaguePass
| 72–89 PHO
| Tuck (20)
| Tied (9)
| January (8)
| Talking Stick Resort Arena12,497
|-
| rowspan=2| Sun Jun 17
| Los Angeles Sparks
| @
| Chicago Sky
| NBA TV, The U Too, SpecSN
| 81–72 LAS
| Gray (21)
| Tied (11)
| Vandersloot (7)
| Wintrust Arena5,584
|-
| Phoenix Mercury
| @
| Las Vegas
| NBA TV, ATTSN-RM
| 92–80 PHO
| Taurasi (28)
| Coffey (12)
| Taurasi (7)
| Mandalay Bay Events Center4,432
|-
| rowspan=5| Tues Jun 19
| Atlanta Dream
| @
| New York Liberty
| LeaguePass, MSG+
| 72–79 NYL
| McCoughtry (39)
| McCoughtry (14)
| Boyd (11)
| Westchester County Center1,627
|-
| Chicago Sky
| @
| Washington Mystics
| LeaguePass, NBCSWA, The U Too
| 60–88 WAS
| Toliver (19)
| Parker (9)
| Toliver (8)
| Capital One Arena1,419
|-
| Dallas Wings
| @
| Minnesota Lynx
| LeaguePass, FSNTH GO
| 83–91 MIN
| Moore (21)
| Fowles (17)
| Tied (7)
| Target Center9,114
|-
| Las Vegas
| @
| Seattle Storm
| Twitter, KZJO-TV
| 89–77 LVA
| Stewart (27)
| Wilson (16)
| Loyd (7)
| KeyArena6,395
|-
| Indiana Fever
| @
| Los Angeles Sparks
| LeaguePass, SpecSN
| 55–74 LAS
| Parker (15)
| Achonwa (14)
| Gray (7)
| Staples Center8,857
|-
| rowspan=6| Fri Jun 22
| Connecticut Sun
| @
| Atlanta Dream
| LeaguePass, FSSE-ATL, NBCSB
| 70–75 ATL
| McCoughtry (25)
| Williams (10)
| Tied (4)
| McCamish Pavilion4,047
|-
| Los Angeles Sparks
| @
| Dallas Wings
| LeaguePass, FSSW-DAL+
| 72–101 DAL
| Cambage (20)
| Powers (8)
| Diggins–Smith (11)
| College Park Center5,672
|-
| Washington Mystics
| @
| Chicago Sky
| ESPN3, The U Too, Monumental
| 93–77 CHI
| Delle Donne (30)
| Sanders (11)
| Vandersloot (7)
| Wintrust Arena5,831
|-
| New York Liberty
| @
| Las Vegas
| ESPN2
| 78–88 LVA
| McBride (27)
| Wilson (14)
| Charles (5)
| Mandalay Bay Events Center5,478
|-
| Minnesota Lynx
| @
| Phoenix Mercury
| ESPN3, FSA+, FSNTH+
| 83–72 PHO
| Tied (23)
| Griner (13)
| Taurasi (6)
| Talking Stick Resort Arena11,349
|-
| Indiana Fever
| @
| Seattle Storm
| ESPN2, KZJO-TV
| 63–72 SEA
| Loyd (25)
| Howard (9)
| Bird (7)
| KeyArena8,142
|-
| rowspan=5| Sun Jun 24
| Seattle Storm
| @
| Dallas Wings
| NBA TV, FSSW-DAL+
| 97–76 SEA
| Stewart (28)
| Stewart (12)
| Bird (10)
| College Park Center4,084
|-
| New York Liberty
| @
| Los Angeles Sparks
| LeaguePass, SpecSN, MSG+
| 54–80 LAS
| Williams (25)
| Ogwumike (10)
| Gray (11)
| Staples Center9,203
|-
| Connecticut Sun
| @
| Indiana Fever
| LeaguePass, FSIND, NBCSB
| 87–78 CON
| Banham (20)
| B. Jones (10)
| Bentley (6)
| Bankers Life Fieldhouse5,458
|-
| Minnesota Lynx
| @
| Las Vegas
| NBA TV, ATTSN-RM
| 88–73 MIN
| Moore (23)
| Fowles (10)
| Whalen (9)
| Mandalay Bay Arena
|-
| Chicago Sky
| @
| Phoenix Mercury
| LeaguePass, The U Too
| 88–97 CHI
| Quigley (20)
| Griner (13)
| Vandersloot (12)
| Wintrust Arena4,741
|-
| rowspan=4| Tues Jun 26
| Phoenix Mercury
| @
| New York Liberty
| LeaguePass, MSG+
| 83–69 PHO
| Taurasi (27)
| Griner (9)
| Tied (7)
| Westchester County Center1,839
|-
| Connecticut Sun
| @
| Washington Mystics
| LeaguePass, NBCSWA, NBCSB
| 80–92 WAS
| Delle Donne (25)
| Ogwumike (11)
| Toliver (8)
| Capital One Arena4,139
|-
| Seattle Storm
| @
| Minnesota Lynx
| LeaguePass, FSNTH GO
| 79–91 MIN
| Moore (32)
| Fowles (17)
| Bird (9)
| Target Center8,634
|-
| Dallas Wings
| @
| Los Angeles Sparks
| Twitter, SpecSN
| 83–87 LAS
| Parker (29)
| Cambage (14)
| Parker (7)
| Staples Center10,002
|-
| rowspan=3| Wed Jun 27
| Atlanta Dream
| @
| Chicago Sky
| LeaguePass
| 80–93 CHI
| DeShields (23)
| DeShields (11)
| Vandersloot (11)
| Wintrust Arena8,521
|-
| Indiana Fever
| @
| Connecticut Sun
| NBA TV, NBCSB
| 89–101 CON
| Vivians (25)
| Ogwumike (10)
| J. Thomas (6)
| Mohegan Sun Arena5,112
|-
| Dallas Wings
| @
| Las Vegas Aces
| NBA TV, ATTSN-RM
| 97–91 DAL
| McBride (38)
| Wilson (15)
| Tied (8)
| Mandalay Bay Events Center5,246
|-
| rowspan=2| Thurs Jun 28
| New York Liberty
| @
| Washington Mystics
| NBA TV, NBCSWA, MSG+
| 77–80 WAS
| Delle Donne (22)
| Charles (7)
| Charles (6)
| Capital One Arena4,473
|-
| Los Angeles Sparks
| @
| Seattle Storm
| ESPN2
| 72–81 SEA
| Tied (27)
| Parker (11)
| Bird (11)
| KeyArena8,447
|-
| rowspan=4| Fri Jun 29
| Phoenix Mercury
| @
| Indiana Fever
| LeaguePass
| 95–77 PHO
| Taurasi (25)
| Bonner (9)
| Turner (7)
| Bankers Life Fieldhouse7,241
|-
| Chicago Sky
| @
| New York Liberty
| LeaguePass, MSG+, The U Too
| 103–99 CHI
| Charles (24)
| Dolson (6)
| Vandersloot (11)
| Westchester County Center1,837
|-
| Atlanta Dream
| @
| Minnesota Lynx
| NBA TV, FSNTH GO
| 74–85 MIN
| Moore (24)
| Fowles (15)
| Whalen (7)
| Target Center9,209
|-
| Los Angeles Sparks
| @
| Las Vegas
| LeaguePass, ATTSN-RM, SpecSN
| 78–94 LVA
| Wilson (29)
| Plum (9)
| Beard (7)
| Mandalay Bay Events Center5,124
|-
| Sat Jun 30
| Phoenix Mercury
| @
| Washington Mystics
| LeaguePass, Monumental
| 84–74 PHO
| Delle Donne (27)
| Delle Donne (13)
| Taurasi (9)
| Capital One Arena6,218
|-

|-

|-
| rowspan=5| Sun Jul 1
| Minnesota Lynx
| @
| Dallas Wings
| LeaguePass, FSSW-DAL+, FSNTH+
| 76–72 MIN
| Moore (26)
| Fowles (9)
| Diggins–Smith (7)
| College Park Center4,448
|-
| Las Vegas
| @
| Los Angeles Sparks
| LeaguePass, SpecSN
| 71–87 LAS
| Lavender (17)
| Ogwumike (7)
| Young (8)
| Staples Center12,003
|-
| Atlanta Dream
| @
| Indiana Fever
| LeaguePass, WNDY
| 87–83 ATL
| Vivians (27)
| Tied (7)
| Sykes (7)
| Bankers Life Fieldhouse5,277
|-
| New York Liberty
| @
| Chicago Sky
| LeaguePass, The U Too, MSG+
| 97–94 NYL
| Tied (28)
| Vaughn (11)
| Faulkner (8)
| Wintrust Arena5,382
|-
| Connecticut Sun
| @
| Seattle Storm
| LeaguePass, KZJO-TV, NBCSB
| 70–84 SEA
| Bentley (15)
| Howard (8)
| Bird (9)
| KeyArena9,307
|-
| rowspan=4| Tues Jul 3
| Seattle Storm
| @
| New York Liberty
| LeaguePass, MSG+
| 77–62 SEA
| Tied (21)
| Stewart (8)
| Bird (11)
| Westchester County Center1,749
|-
| Chicago Sky
| @
| Dallas Wings
| LeaguePass, FSSW-DAL+
| 85–108 DAL
| Cambage (37)
| Cambage (10)
| Vandersloot (7)
| College Park Center4,012
|-
| Indiana Fever
| @
| Minnesota Lynx
| Twitter
| 71–59 MIN
| Achonwa (17)
| Brunson (12)
| Brunson (6)
| Target Center8,632
|-
| Connecticut Sun
| @
| Los Angeles Sparks
| LeaguePass, SpecSN, WCCT
| 73–72 CON
| Ogwumike (21)
| Parker (8)
| Banham (6)
| Staples Center6,280
|-
| rowspan=5| Thurs Jul 5
| New York Liberty
| @
| Washington Mystics
| ESPN3, NBCSWA, MSG+
| 67–86 WAS
| Charles (26)
| Charles (12)
| Cloud (10)
| Capital One Arena4,674
|-
| Indiana Fever
| @
| Dallas Wings
| ESPN3, FSSW-DAL+
| 63–90 DAL
| Stevens (26)
| Johnson (11)
| Diggins–Smith (7)
| College Park Center4,043
|-
| Los Angeles Sparks
| @
| Minnesota Lynx
| ESPN2
| 72–83 MIN
| Fowles (27)
| Brunson (12)
| Gray (8)
| Target Center9,303
|-
| Chicago Sky
| @
| Las Vegas Aces
| LeaguePass, The U Too, ATTSN-RM
| 80–84 LVA
| McBride (28)
| Swords (12)
| Vandersloot (9)
| Mandalay Bay Events Center4,699
|-
| Connecticut Sun
| @
| Phoenix Mercury
| LeaguePass, FSA+
| 77–84 PHO
| Taurasi (25)
| Bonner (13)
| Turner (5)
| Talking Stick Resort Arena8,599
|-
| Fri Jul 6
| Seattle Storm
| @
| Atlanta Dream
| LeaguePass, FSSE-ATL
| 95–86 ATL
| Stewart (29)
| Howard (11)
| Bird (10)
| McCamish Pavilion3,935
|-
| rowspan=3| Sat Jul 7
| Washington Mystics
| @
| Los Angeles Sparks
| LeaguePass, SpecSN, Monumental
| 83–74 WAS
| Gray (23)
| Ogwumike (13)
| Ogwumike (5)
| Staples Center10,163
|-
| Minnesota Lynx
| @
| Chicago Sky
| LeaguePass, The U Too
| 63–77 CHI
| Moore (16)
| Fowles (13)
| Vandersloot (9)
| Wintrust Arena6,139
|-
| Connecticut Sun
| @
| Las Vegas Aces
| LeaguePass, ATTSN-RM, WCCT
| 90–94 LVA
| Wilson (34)
| Wilson (14)
| Plum (10)
| Mandalay Bay Events Center3,363
|-
| rowspan=3| Sun Jul 8
| Phoenix Mercury
| @
| Atlanta Dream
| LeaguePass, FSSE-ATL, FSA+
| 70–76 ATL
| Taurasi (19)
| Breland (12)
| McCoughtry (4)
| McCamish Pavilion3,952
|-
| Dallas Wings
| @
| New York Liberty
| LeaguePass, MSG
| 97–87 DAL
| Diggins–Smith (32)
| Cambage (12)
| Gray (6)
| Westchester County Center1,719
|-
| Washington Mystics
| @
| Seattle Storm
| LeaguePass, KZJO-TV, Monumental
| 91–97 SEA
| Delle Donne (29)
| Stewart (10)
| Toliver (6)
| KeyArena8,724
|-
| rowspan=3| Tues Jul 10
| Los Angeles Sparks
| @
| Seattle Storm
| Twitter, KZJO-TV, SpecSN
| 77–75 (OT) LAS
| Parker (21)
| Stewart (13)
| Parker (10)
| KeyArena9,686
|-
| Phoenix Mercury
| @
| Dallas Wings
| LeaguePass, FSSW-DAL+, FSA+
| 72–101 DAL
| Griner (21)
| Johnson (9)
| Mitchell (8)
| College Park Center4,034
|-
| Las Vegas Aces
| @
| Chicago Sky
| LeaguePass, The U Too
| 98–74 CHI
| McBride (18)
| 3 Tied (8)
| Vandersloot (8)
| Wintrust Arena7,696
|-
| rowspan=3| Wed Jul 11
| New York Liberty
| @
| Connecticut Sun
| NBA TV, NBCSB, MSG+
| 79–76 NYL
| Charles (19)
| Charles (11)
| Boyd (8)
| Mohegan Sun Arena7,413
|-
| Atlanta Dream
| @
| Washington Mystics
| LeaguePass, Monumental
| 106–89 ATL
| McCoughtry (26)
| Breland (10)
| Breland (7)
| Capital One Arena11,354
|-
| Minnesota Lynx
| @
| Indiana Fever
| LeaguePass, WNDY
| 87–65 MIN
| Fowles (20)
| Fowles (10)
| Fowles (7)
| Bankers Life Fieldhouse10,006
|-
| Thurs Jul 12
| Dallas Wings
| @
| Los Angeles Sparks
| LeaguePass, MSG+
| 92–77 DAL
| Diggins–Smith (22)
| Tied (7)
| Diggins–Smith (11)
| Staples Center13,502
|-
| rowspan=4| Fri Jul 13
| Indiana Fever
| @
| Atlanta Dream
| LeaguePass, FSSE-ATL
| 74–87 ATL
| T. Mitchell (17)
| Breland (8)
| McCoughtry (7)
| McCamish Pavilion3,807
|-
| Phoenix Mercury
| @
| Connecticut Sun
| LeaguePass, NBCSB
| 87–91 CON
| Taurasi (28)
| Williams (10)
| A. Thomas (10)
| Mohegan Sun Arena7,696
|-
| Chicago Sky
| @
| Washington Mystics
| LeaguePass, NBCSWA, The U Too
| 72–88 WAS
| Tied (25)
| Sanders (8)
| Vandersloot (9)
| Capital One Arena5,858
|-
| Las Vegas Aces
| @
| Minnesota Lynx
| LeaguePass, FSNTH+
| 85–77 LVA
| McBride (24)
| Fowles (17)
| McBride (9)
| Target Center9,813
|-
| Sat Jul 14
| Dallas Wings
| @
| Seattle Storm
| LeaguePass, KZJO-TV
| 84–91 SEA
| Stewart (35)
| Stewart (10)
| Diggins–Smith (7)
| KeyArena9,686
|-
| rowspan=5 | Sun Jul 15
| Washington Mystics
| @
| Atlanta Dream
| LeaguePass, FSSE-ATL, Monumental
| 77–80 ATL
| Delle Donne (23)
| Delle Donne (11)
| Toliver (6)
| McCamish Pavilion3,880
|-
| Chicago Sky
| @
| New York Liberty
| NBA TV, MSG
| 84–107 NYL
| Charles (21)
| Vaughn (7)
| Boyd (10)
| Westchester County Center2,073
|-
| Phoenix Mercury
| @
| Indiana Fever
| NBA TV, WNDY, FSA+
| 101–82 PHO
| Griner (36)
| Griner (12)
| Taurasi (7)
| Bankers Life Fieldhouse6,302
|-
| Los Angeles Sparks
| @
| Las Vegas Aces
| LeaguePass, ATTSN-RM, SpecSN
| 99–78 LAS
| Parker (34)
| Parker (11)
| Parker (9)
| Mandalay Bay Events Center4,810
|-
| Connecticut Sun
| @
| Minnesota Lynx
| NBA TV, FSNTH, WCCT
| 83–64 CON
| Tuck (15)
| Tied (8)
| Clarendon (5)
| Target Center9,234
|-
| rowspan=2 | Tues Jul 17
| New York Liberty
| @
| Dallas Wings
| Twitter, FSSW-DAL+, MSG+
| 87–104 DAL
| Cambage (53)
| Cambage (10)
| Diggins–Smith (7)
| College Park Center6,459
|-
| Atlanta Dream
| @
| Connecticut Sun
| LeaguePass, NBCSB
| 86–83 ATL
| McCoughtry (24)
| Breland (11)
| J. Thomas (6)
| Mohegan Sun Arena5,555
|-
| rowspan=2 | Wed Jul 18
| Seattle Storm
| @
| Chicago Sky
| LeaguePass
| 101–83 SEA
| Stewart (30)
| Loyd (10)
| Bird (11)
| Wintrust Arena10,024
|-
| Indiana Fever
| @
| Minnesota Lynx
| NBA TV, FSNTH GO
| 65–89 MIN
| Fowles (30)
| Fowles (16)
| Larkins (8)
| Target Center17,933
|-
| rowspan=3 | Thur Jul 19
| New York Liberty
| @
| Atlanta Dream
| ESPN3, MSG+
| 68–82 ATL
| Montgomery (24)
| Tied (12)
| Boyd (10)
| McCamish Pavilion3,074
|-
| Washington Mystics
| @
| Dallas Wings
| ESPN2
| 81–90 DAL
| Cambage (35)
| Cambage (17)
| Toliver (9)
| College Park Center4,411
|-
| Las Vegas Aces
| @
| Phoenix Mercury
| LeaguePass
| 85–82 LVA
| Taurasi (33)
| Wilson (12)
| Taurasi (6)
| Talking Stick Resort Arena8,587
|-
| rowspan=3 | Fri Jul 20
| Seattle Storm
| @
| Connecticut Sun
| NBA TV, NBCSB
| 78–65 SEA
| Loyd (31)
| Ogwumike (12)
| Tied (5)
| Mohegan Sun Arena7,908
|-
| Dallas Wings
| @
| Chicago Sky
| NBA TV, The U Too
| 81–90 DAL
| Tied (23)
| Vandersloot (10)
| Vandersloot (15)
| Wintrust Arena4,962
|-
| Indiana Fever
| @
| Los Angeles Sparks
| LeaguePass, SpecSN
| 78–76 LAS
| Parker (24)
| Parker (12)
| Parker (7)
| Staples Center10,532
|-
| rowspan=2 | Sat Jul 21
| Washington Mystics
| @
| New York Liberty
| NBA TV, MSG, Monumental
| 95–78 WAS
| Delle Donne (30)
| Delle Donne (10)
| Toliver (8)
| Westchester County Center2,005
|-
| Minnesota Lynx
| @
| Phoenix Mercury
| LeaguePass
| 80–75 MIN
| Moore (38)
| Brunson (11)
| Tied (3)
| Talking Stick Resort Arena11,473
|-
| rowspan=4 | Sun Jul 22
| Seattle Storm
| @
| Atlanta Dream
| NBA TV, FSSE-ATL
| 74–87 ATL
| Stewart (31)
| Tied (8)
| Bird (6)
| McCamish Pavilion4,916
|-
| Connecticut Sun
| @
| Dallas Wings
| LeaguePass, FSSW-DAL, WCCT
| 92–75 DAL
| Cambage (25)
| Cambage (10)
| J. Thomas (9)
| College Park Center4,935
|-
| Indiana Fever
| @
| Las Vegas Aces
| LeaguePass, ATTSN-RM
| 74–88 LVA
| Wilson (24)
| Tied (10)
| Pondexter (7)
| Mandalay Bay Events Center5,368
|-
| Los Angeles Sparks
| @
| Chicago Sky
| NBA TV, The U Too, SpecSN
| 93–76 LAS
| Parker (23)
| Parker (12)
| Vandersloot (10)
| Wintrust Arena6,477
|-
| rowspan=4 | Tues Jul 24
| Washington Mystics
| @
| Connecticut Sun
| ESPN3, NBCSB, Monumental
| 68–94 CON
| J. Jones (23)
| Williams (10)
| Williams (6)
| Mohegan Sun Arena5,125
|-
| Seattle Storm
| @
| Indiana Fever
| ESPN3
| 92–72 SEA
| Tied (26)
| Dupree (12)
| Bird (11)
| Bankers Life Fieldhouse5,908
|-
| New York Liberty
| @
| Minnesota Lynx
| ESPN2
| 82–85 MIN
| Charles (32)
| Charles (15)
| Boyd (9)
| Target Center9,830
|-
| Atlanta Dream
| @
| Los Angeles Sparks
| Twitter, SpecSN
| 81–71 ATL
| McCoughtry (19)
| Parker (9)
| Montgomery (6)
| Staples Center9,324
|-
| Wed Jul 25
| Chicago Sky
| @
| Phoenix Mercury
| LeaguePass
| 101–87 CHI
| Bonner (30)
| Bonner (13)
| Vandersloot (11)
| Talking Stick Resort Arena10,338
|- style="background:#FAFAD2"
| Sat Jul 28
| Team Delle Donne
| @
| Team Parker
| ABC
| 112–119 CNP
| Toliver (23)
| Moore (8)
| Tied (8)
| Target Center15,922
|-
| rowspan=3 | Tues Jul 31
| Washington Mystics
| @
| Atlanta Dream
| Twitter
| 86–71 WAS
| Delle Donne (28)
| Delle Donne (16)
| Toliver (4)
| McCamish Pavilion3,648
|-
| Chicago Sky
| @
| Dallas Wings
| NBA TV, FSSW-DAL+, The U Too
| 92–91 DAL
| Cambage (33)
| Johnson (14)
| Vandersloot (14)
| College Park Center3,696
|-
| Seattle Storm
| @
| Phoenix Mercury
| Twitter
| 102–91 SEA
| Loyd (29)
| Howard (10)
| Tied (7)
| Talking Stick Resort Arena10,005
|-

|-

|-
| rowspan=2 | Wed Aug 1
| New York Liberty
| @
| Connecticut Sun
| NBA TV, NBCSB, MSG+
| 77–92 CON
| J. Jones (21)
| A. Thomas (12)
| Boyd (8)
| Mohegan Sun Arena6,412
|-
| Phoenix Mercury
| @
| Las Vegas Aces
| NBA TV, ATTSN-RM
| 104–93 PHO
| Taurasi (37)
| Bonner (14)
| Taurasi (9)
| Mandalay Bay Events Center5,129
|-
| rowspan=2 | Thur Aug 2
| Dallas Wings
| @
| Indiana Fever
| NBA TV, FSIND, FSSW-DAL+
| 78–84 IND
| Cambage (37)
| Tied (9)
| Wheeler (5)
| Bankers Life Fieldhouse5,981
|-
| Minnesota Lynx
| @
| Los Angeles Sparks
| ESPN2
| 57–79 LAS
| Parker (23)
| Parker (10)
| Gray (9)
| Staples Center9,542
|-
| rowspan=3 | Fri Aug 3
| Chicago Sky
| @
| Atlanta Dream
| LeaguePass, FSSE-ATL, The U Too
| 74–89 ATL
| Vandersloot (21)
| Breland (9)
| Tied (7)
| McCamish Pavilion5,120
|-
| Las Vegas Aces
| @
| Washington Mystics
| None
| LVA Forfeit
| –
| –
| –
| Capital One Arena–
|-
| Minnesota Lynx
| @
| Seattle Storm
| NBA TV, KZJO-TV
| 75–85 SEA
| Tied (20)
| Fowles (16)
| Bird (11)
| KeyArena12,064
|-
| Sat Aug 4
| Indiana Fever
| @
| New York Liberty
| NBA TV, MSG
| 68–55 IND
| Dupree (25)
| Achonwa (13)
| Wheeler (7)
| Westchester County Center2,225
|-
| rowspan=4 | Sat Aug 5
| Las Vegas Aces
| @
| Connecticut Sun
| LeaguePass, NBCSB
| 88–109 CON
| J. Thomas (30)
| Tied (7)
| Williams (5)
| Mohegan Sun Arena6,791
|-
| Washington Mystics
| @
| Dallas Wings
| NBA TV, FSSW-DAL+, Monumental
| 76–74 WAS
| Tied (16)
| Powers (5)
| Toliver (5)
| College Park Center5,623
|-
| Phoenix Mercury
| @
| Los Angeles Sparks
| NBA TV, SpecSN
| 75–78 LAS
| Gray (24)
| Parker (14)
| January (9)
| Staples Center19,076
|-
| Atlanta Dream
| @
| Minnesota Lynx
| LeaguePass, FSNTH, FSSE-ATL
| 86–66 ATL
| Hayes (28)
| Fowles (10)
| Sykes (6)
| Target Center9,333
|-
| Mon Aug 6
| Seattle Storm
| @
| New York Liberty
| NBA TV, MSG+
| 96–80 NYL
| Stewart (32)
| Howard (10)
| Tied (7)
| Madison Square Garden12,488
|-
| rowspan=4 | Tues Aug 7
| Las Vegas Aces
| @
| Atlanta Dream
| NBA TV, FSSO
| 100–109 ATL
| Tied (22)
| Breland (11)
| Plum (8)
| McCamish Pavilion4,033
|-
| Seattle Storm
| @
| Indiana Fever
| LeaguePass, FSIND
| 94–79 SEA
| Dupree (22)
| Stewart (12)
| Tied (8)
| Bankers Life Fieldhouse6,401
|-
| Minnesota Lynx
| @
| Chicago Sky
| Twitter, The U Too
| 85–64 MIN
| Moore (31)
| Fowles (11)
| Robinson (11)
| Wintrust Arena6,388
|-
| Washington Mystics
| @
| Phoenix Mercury
| NBA TV, Monumental
| 103–98 WAS
| Griner (35)
| Griner (11)
| Tied (6)
| Talking Stick Resort Arena7,769
|-
| rowspan=2 | Wed Aug 8
| Los Angeles Sparks
| @
| New York Liberty
| LeaguePass, MSG+, SpecSN
| 82–81 LAS
| Charles (27)
| Stokes (11)
| Boyd (7)
| Westchester County Center2,481
|-
| Connecticut Sun
| @
| Dallas Wings
| NBA TV, FSSW-DAL
| 101–92 CON
| Cambage (29)
| Williams (10)
| J. Thomas (9)
| College Park Center3,483
|-
| rowspan=3 | Thurs Aug 9
| Seattle Storm
| @
| Washington Mystics
| NBA TV, Monumental
| 77–100 WAS
| Delle Donne (30)
| Sanders (12)
| Cloud (8)
| Capital One Arena6,808
|-
| Los Angeles Sparks
| @
| Atlanta Dream
| NBA TV, FSSO
| 73–79 ATL
| Parker (20)
| Parker (12)
| Bentley (8)
| McCamish Pavilion4,235
|-
| Minnesota Lynx
| @
| Las Vegas Aces
| NBA TV, ATTSN-RM
| 89–73 MIN
| Moore (34)
| Fowles (19)
| Wright (6)
| Mandalay Bay Arena4,497
|-
| rowspan=2 | Fri Aug 10
| Connecticut Sun
| @
| Chicago Sky
| LeaguePass, The U Too, NBCSB
| 86–97 CHI
| Vandersloot (20)
| Coates (10)
| Vandersloot (15)
| Wintrust Arena5,976
|-
| Indiana Fever
| @
| Phoenix Mercury
| NBA TV, FSA+, FSIND
| 74–94 PHO
| K. Mitchell (20)
| Bonner (10)
| Tied (4)
| Talking Stick Resort Arena8,860
|-
| rowspan=2 | Sat Aug 11
| Dallas Wings
| @
| Atlanta Dream
| NBA TV, FSSE-ATL, FSSW-DAL+
| 72–92 ATL
| Diggins-Smith (26)
| Williams (9)
| Diggins-Smith (10)
| McCamish Pavilion4,937
|-
| Indiana Fever
| @
| Las Vegas Aces
| LeaguePass, ATTSN-RM
| 74–92 LVA
| Plum (20)
| Wilson (8)
| Wheeler (5)
| Mandalay Bay Events Center5,213
|-
| rowspan=5 | Sun Aug 12
| Atlanta Dream
| @
| New York Liberty
| LeaguePass, MSG
| 86–77 ATL
| Montgomery (30)
| Stokes (10)
| Charles (5)
| Westchester County Center2,362
|-
| Chicago Sky
| @
| Connecticut Sun
| LeaguePass, NBCSB
| 75–82 CON
| Williams (22)
| J. Jones (15)
| J. Thomas (8)
| Mohegan Sun Arena7,687
|-
| Dallas Wings
| @
| Washington Mystics
| NBA TV, NBCSWA
| 80–93 WAS
| Atkins (26)
| Gray (12)
| Toliver (7)
| Capital One Arena6,362
|-
| Los Angeles Sparks
| @
| Phoenix Mercury
| ESPN2
| 78–86 PHO
| Bonner (31)
| Griner (13)
| Taurasi (14)
| Talking Stick Resort Arena10,618
|-
| Seattle Storm
| @
| Minnesota Lynx
| ESPN3, FSNTH
| 81–72 MIN
| Fowles (28)
| Stewart (17)
| Tied (6)
| Target Center9,123
|-
| rowspan=3 | Tues Aug 14
| Dallas Wings
| @
| Connecticut Sun
| Twitter, NBCSB
| 76–96 CON
| Diggins–Smith (17)
| J. Jones (10)
| Diggins–Smith (6)
| Capital One Arena6,362
|-
| Chicago Sky
| @
| Minnesota Lynx
| NBA TV, FSNTH GO, The U Too
| 91–88 CHI
| Dolson (20)
| Fowles (13)
| Vandersloot (7)
| Mohegan Sun Arena7,687
|-
| New York Liberty
| @
| Los Angeles Sparks
| NBA TV, SpecSN, MSG+
| 66–74 LAS
| Gray (26)
| Parker (10)
| Gray (5)
| Staples Center11,067
|-
| rowspan=2 | Wed Aug 15
| Washington Mystics
| @
| Indiana Fever
| NBA TV, Monumental
| 76–62 WAS
| Delle Donne (25)
| Sanders (13)
| Cloud (7)
| Bankers Life Fieldhouse7,636
|-
| New York Liberty
| @
| Las Vegas Aces
| NBA TV, ATTSN-RM, MSG+
| 91–88 CHI
| Wilson (19)
| Stokes (11)
| Boyd (6)
| Mandalay Bay Events Center7,159
|-
| rowspan=5 | Fri Aug 17
| Minnesota Lynx
| @
| Connecticut Sun
| LeaguePass, NBCSB
| 79–96 CON
| J. Jones (26)
| Tied (8)
| Tied (8)
| Mohegan Sun Arena7,089
|-
| Los Angeles Sparks
| @
| Washington Mystics
| NBA TV, Monumental, SpecSN
| 67–69 WAS
| Delle Donne (16)
| Tied (10)
| Parker (7)
| Capital One Arena7,400
|-
| Las Vegas Aces
| @
| Dallas Wings
| LeaguePass, FSSW-DAL+
| 102–107 DAL
| Cambage (43)
| Cambage (13)
| McBride (12)
| College Park Center6,209
|-
| Atlanta Dream
| @
| Phoenix Mercury
| LeaguePass
| 95–104 PHO
| Bonner (31)
| Griner (13)
| Taurasi (14)
| Talking Stick Resort Arena10,618
|-
| New York Liberty
| @
| Seattle Storm
| NBA TV, KZJO-TV, MSG+
| 77–85 SEA
| Stewart (22)
| Tied (15)
| Bird (6)
| KeyArena10,873
|-
| Sat Aug 18
| Chicago Sky
| @
| Indiana Fever
| NBA TV, FSIND
| 115–106 CHI
| Dupree (30)
| Achonwa (11)
| Vandersloot(10)
| Bankers Life Fieldhouse8,442
|-
| rowspan=6 | Sun Aug 19
| Los Angeles Sparks
| @
| Connecticut Sun
| Twitter, NBCSB, SpecSN
| 86–89 CON
| J. Thomas (27)
| Parker (10)
| Tied (7)
| Mohegan Sun Arena8,040
|-
| Atlanta Dream
| @
| Las Vegas Aces
| ESPN3, ATTSN-RM
| 93–78 ATL
| Wilson (21)
| Hamby (8)
| Montgomery (8)
| Mandalay Bay Events Center5,737
|-
| New York Liberty
| @
| Phoenix Mercury
| ESPN3, MSG+
| 85–96 PHO
| Nurse (28)
| Bonner (10)
| Boyd (7)
| Talking Stick Resort Arena13,106
|-
| Indiana Fever
| @
| Chicago Sky
| ESPN3, The U Too
| 97–92 IND
| DeShields (27)
| Achonwa (9)
| Vandersloot (7)
| Wintrust Arena7,118
|-
| Dallas Wings
| @
| Seattle Storm
| ESPN3, KZJO-TV
| 68–84 SEA
| Johnson (16)
| Russell (9)
| Canada (5)
| KeyArena12,574
|-
| Washington Mystics
| @
| Minnesota Lynx
| ESPN2
| 83–88 MIN
| Fowles (26)
| Fowles (14)
| Whalen (6)
| Target Center13,013
|-

|-
! colspan=2 style="background:#094480; color:white" | 2018 WNBA postseason
|-

|-
| rowspan=2| Tues Aug 21
| 8:30 PM
| Dallas Wings
| @
| Phoenix Mercury
| ESPN2
| 83–101 PHO
| Bonner (29)
| Cambage (12)
| Taurasi (12)
| Wells Fargo Arena4,976
|-
| 10:30 PM
| Minnesota Lynx
| @
| Los Angeles Sparks
| ESPN2
| 68–75 LAS
| Gray (26)
| Fowles (12)
| Gray (6)
| Staples Center8,598
|-

|-

|-
| rowspan=2 | Thur Aug. 23
| 6:30 PM
| Los Angeles Sparks
| @
| Washington Mystics
| ESPN2
| 64–96 WAS
| Delle Donne (19)
| Delle Donne (12)
| Toliver (9)
| Charles Smith Center3,548
|-
| 8:30 PM
| Phoenix Mercury
| @
| Connecticut Sun
| ESPN2
| 96–86 PHO
| 3 Tied (27)
| Bonner (18)
| J. Jones (7)
| Mohegan Sun Arena7,858
|-

|-

|-
| rowspan=2|Sun Aug 26
| 3:00 PM
| Washington Mystics
| @
| Atlanta Dream
| ESPN2
| 87–84 WAS
| Delle Donne (32)
| Delle Donne (13)
| Cloud (6)
| McCamish Pavilion5,086
|-
| 5:00 PM
| Phoenix Mercury
| @
| Seattle Storm
| ESPN2
| 87–91 SEA
| Stewart (28)
| Bonner (13)
| Bird (10)
| KeyArena9,686
|-
| rowspan=2|Tues Aug 28
| 8:00 PM
| Washington Mystics
| @
| Atlanta Dream
| ESPN2
| 75–78 ATL
| Delle Donne (27)
| Tied (14)
| Tied (6)
| McCamish Pavilion3,813
|-
| 10:00 PM
| Phoenix Mercury
| @
| Seattle Storm
| ESPN2
| 87–91 (OT) SEA
| Taurasi (28)
| Tied (10)
| Taurasi (8)
| KeyArena9,686
|-
| rowspan=2|Fri Aug 31
| 8:00 PM
| Atlanta Dream
| @
| Washington Mystics
| ESPNNews, NBA TV
| 81–76 ATL
| Hayes (23)
| Tied (11)
| Kristi Toliver (6)
| Charles Smith Center3,867
|-
| 10:00 PM
| Seattle Storm
| @
| Phoenix Mercury
| ESPNNews, NBA TV
| 86–66 PHO
| Bonner (27)
| Tied (11)
| Bird (11)
| Talking Stick Resort Arena15,185
|-
| rowspan=2|Sun Sep 2
| 3:00 PM
| Atlanta Dream
| @
| Washington Mystics
| ESPN2
| 97–76 WAS
| Toliver (22)
| Delle Donne (10)
| Montgomery (10)
| Charles Smith Center3,722
|-
| 5:00 PM
| Seattle Storm
| @
| Phoenix Mercury
| ESPN2
| 84–86 PHO
| Griner (29)
| Griner (12)
| Loyd (12)
| Talking Stick Resort Arena8,137
|-
| rowspan=2|Tues Sep 4
| 8:00 PM
| Washington Mystics
| @
| Atlanta Dream
| ESPN2
| 86–81 WAS
| Atkins (20)
| Breland (12)
| Natasha Cloud (5)
| McCamish Pavilion4,435
|-
| 10:00 PM
| Phoenix Mercury
| @
| Seattle Storm
| ESPNNews, NBA TV
| 94–84 SEA
| Stewart (28)
| Alysha Clark (13)
| Griner (6)
| KeyArena8,992
|-

|-

|-
| September 7 || 9:00 PM || Washington Mystics || @ || Seattle Storm || ESPNews || 76–89 SEA || Tied (23) || Tied (7) || Bird (7) || KeyArena11,486
|-
| September 9 || 3:30 PM ||  Washington Mystics || @ || Seattle Storm || ABC || 73–75 SEA || Stewart (19) || Howard (11) || Bird (4) || KeyArena 14,212
|-
| September 12 || 8:00 PM || Seattle Storm || @ || Washington Mystics || ESPN2 || 98–82 SEA || Stewart (30) || Howard (14) || Bird (10) || EagleBank Arena 9,164
|-

Playoffs

Season award winners

Player of the Week Award

Player of the Month Award

Rookie of the Month Award

Coach of the Month Award

Postseason awards

Coaches

Eastern Conference

Western Conference 

Notes:
 Year with team includes 2018 season.
 Records are from time at current team and are through the end the 2018 season.
 Playoff appearances are from time at current team only.
 WNBA Finals and Championships do not include time with other teams.
 Coaches shown are the coaches who began the 2018 season as head coach of each team.

References 

 
Women's National Basketball Association seasons